The JWP Tag Team Championship was a professional wrestling tag team championship owned by the JWP Joshi Puroresu promotion. The championship was introduced on August 9, 1992, when Cutie Suzuki and Mayumi Ozaki defeated Dynamite Kansai and Sumiko Saito in a tournament final to become the inaugural champions. On August 3, 2008, the title was unified with the Daily Sports Women's Tag Team Championship. Together, the two titles were sometimes referred to as the "JWP Double Crown Tag Team Championship". When JWP Joshi Puroresu went out of business in April 2017, the two titles were separated again with the JWP title remaining with the JWP production company, while the Daily Sports title moved on to Command Bolshoi's new follow-up promotion.

Like most professional wrestling championships, the title was won as a result of a scripted match. There were forty-nine reigns shared among thirty-nine different wrestlers and thirty-seven teams. The title was retired on April 2, 2017, when JWP Joshi Puroresu went out of business. That same day, Command Bolshoi and Leon won the final match contested for the title by making their second successful defense against Kazuki and Rydeen Hagane.

Reigns
Cutie Suzuki and Mayumi Ozaki were the first champions in the title's history, while Command Bolshoi and Leon were the final. Kaori Yoneyama and Toujyuki Leon's only reign holds the record for the longest reign, at 448 days. Azumi Hyuga and Command Bolshoi's only reign holds the record for the shortest reign, at less than one day. Uematsu☆Ran (Ran Yu-Yu and Toshie Uematsu) hold the record for most reigns as a team, with four. Yu-Yu also shares the record for most reigns individually with Command Bolshoi, with seven. Overall, there were forty-nine reigns shared among thirty-nine different wrestlers and thirty-seven teams.

Title history

Combined reigns

By team

By wrestler

See also
Daily Sports Women's Tag Team Championship
Goddess of Stardom Championship
International Ribbon Tag Team Championship
Oz Academy Tag Team Championship
Wave Tag Team Championship
Women's World Tag Team Championship

References

External links
JWP's official website
JWP Tag Team Championship history at Wrestling-Titles.com

JWP Joshi Puroresu championships
Women's professional wrestling tag team championships